The 1961–62 Cypriot First Division was the 24th season of the Cypriot top-level football league.

Overview
It was contested by 13 teams, and Anorthosis Famagusta FC won the championship.

League standings

Results

References
Cyprus - List of final tables (RSSSF)

Cypriot First Division seasons
Cypriot
1